Alain Benoit (born 1948) is a French physicist specialising in low temperature physics. He was awarded the CNRS silver medal in 1993 and the CNRS innovation medal in 2012.

He is a research director at the Grenoble Very Low Temperature Centre, where he contributed to the cooling of the European Space Agency's Planck telescope to 0.1 K. He was elected a member of the French Academy of Sciences in 2002.

References

1948 births
Living people
French National Centre for Scientific Research awards
Cryogenics
French physicists
Research directors of the French National Centre for Scientific Research